Patania ruralis, the mother of pearl moth,  is a species of moth of the family Crambidae. It was described by Giovanni Antonio Scopoli in 1763. It is found in Europe.

The forewings are pale whitish-ochreous, yellowish-tinged; a grey subcostal suffusion and connected orbicular dot; lines rather dark grey, first straight, second serrate, curved, strongly broken inwards beneath middle; a dark grey discal mark, nearly followed by a grey blotch; a grey terminal band, edge parallel to second line. Hindwings with colour, discal mark, and posterior markings as in forewings. The larva is whitish green, sides greener; dorsal line darker; head green.

The moth flies from June to September depending on the location.

The larvae feed on stinging nettle and are notable for their rolling locomotion. Scientists used the rolling behavior of the caterpillar as a model to create next-generation robots that roll.

References

External links
 
 Mother of pearl at UKMoths
 Pleuroptya ruralis at Lepidoptera of Belgium
 Lepiforum.de

Spilomelinae
Moths described in 1763
Moths of Europe
Moths of Japan
Moths of Asia
Rolling animals
Taxa named by Giovanni Antonio Scopoli